Taufa Neuffer (born 30 August 1978) in Tahiti is a footballer who plays as a center back for AS Tefana in the Tahiti Division Fédérale and the Tahiti national football team.

International goals

References

1978 births
Living people
French Polynesian footballers
Tahiti international footballers
Association football defenders
2004 OFC Nations Cup players